Prince William, Duke of Gloucester and Edinburgh may refer to:
Prince William Henry, Duke of Gloucester and Edinburgh, third son of Frederick, Prince of Wales
Prince William Frederick, Duke of Gloucester and Edinburgh, son of Prince William Henry

See also
Prince William (disambiguation)